Your Bad Reputation is a 1922 German silent drama film directed by Franz Eckstein and starring Werner Funck, Olga Limburg and Paul Graetz.

The film's sets were designed by the art director Adolf von Marées.

Cast
 Werner Funck as Baron Herbert von Melzow
 Olga Limburg as Sascha von Rothenburg
 Paul Graetz as Robert Zenker
 Vicky Werckmeister as Olga
 Olga Engl as Frau von Gellin
 Karl Falkenberg as Assessor von Heer
 Hermann Vallentin as Baron von Karwitz
 Rosa Porten

References

Bibliography
 Paolo Caneppele. Entscheidungen der Tiroler Filmzensur 1919-1920-1921: mit einem Index der in Tirol verbotenen Filme 1916–1922. Film Archiv Austria, 2002.

External links

1922 films
Films of the Weimar Republic
German silent feature films
Films directed by Franz Eckstein
German black-and-white films
National Film films
1920s German films